Villa Gamberaia is a seventeenth-century villa near Settignano, outside Florence, Tuscany, Italy.

It is it characterized now by eighteenth-century terraced garden. The setting was praised by Edith Wharton, who saw it after years of tenant occupation with its parterre planted with roses and cabbages, and by Georgina Masson, who saw it restored by Sig. Marcello Marchi after its near ruin during the Second World War. to the immaculately clipped and tailored condition today.

History
The villa, originally a farmhouse; was owned by Matteo Gamberelli, a stonemason, at the beginning of the fifteenth century.  His sons Giovanni and Bernardo became famous architects under the name of Rossellino. After Bernardo's son sold it to Jacopo Riccialbani in 1597, the house was greatly enlarged, then almost completely rebuilt by the following owner, Zenobi Lapi; documents of his time mention a limonaia and the turfed bowling green that is part of the garden layout today.

In 1717 La Gamberaia passed to the Capponi family. Andrea Capponi laid out the long bowling green, planted cypresses, especially in a long allée leading to the monumental fountain enclosed within the bosco (wooded area), and peopled the garden with statues, as can be seen in an etching by Giuseppe Zocchi dedicated to marchese Scipione Capponi, which shows the cypress avenue half-grown and the bowling green flanked by mature trees that have since gone. The villa already stood on its raised platform, extended to one side, where the water parterre is today.  The parterre was laid out with clipped broderies in the French manner in the eighteenth century, as a detailed estate map described by Georgina Masson demonstrates. Olive groves have always occupied the slopes below the garden, which has a distant view of the roofs and towers of Florence.

The monumental fountain set into a steep hillside at one lateral flank of this terraced garden has a seated god flanked by lions in stucco relief in a niche decorated with pebble mosaics and rusticated stonework.

Edith Wharton attributed the preservation of the garden at the Villa Gamberaia to its "obscure fate" during the nineteenth century, when more prominent gardens with richer owners, in more continuous attendance, had their historic features improved clean away. Shortly after Wharton saw it, the villa was purchased in 1895 by a reputed Princess: Jeanne Ghyka, rumored sister of Queen Natalia of Serbia, who lived here with her American companion, Miss Blood, and thoroughly restored it;. It was she who substituted pools of water for the parterre beds.

During World War II, the villa was almost completely destroyed.  Marcello Marchi restored it after the war, using old prints, maps and photographs for guidance.

Notes

References 
 Ramsay, A., and Attlee, H. Italian Gardens, Robertson McCarta, London 1989.

External links
Patricia Osmond, "Villa Gamberaia, Settignano" — with bibliography.
Official website of Villa Gamberaia.

Gamberaia
Gamberaia
Cultural landscapes
Articles containing video clips